Articulatory speech recognition means the recovery of speech (in forms of phonemes, syllables or words) from acoustic signals with the help of articulatory modeling or an extra input of articulatory movement data. Speech recognition (or automatic speech recognition, acoustic speech recognition) means the recovery of speech from acoustics (sound wave) only.  Articulatory information is extremely helpful when the acoustic input is in low quality, perhaps because of noise or missing data.

References

See also
Speech recognition
Articulatory synthesis
Automated lip reading
Computational linguistics

Speech recognition
Computational linguistics